222 (two hundred [and] twenty-two) is the natural number following 221 and preceding 223.

In mathematics 
It is a decimal repdigit and a strobogrammatic number (meaning that it looks the same turned upside down on a calculator display). It is one of the numbers whose digit sum in decimal is the same as it is in binary.

222 is a noncototient, meaning that it cannot be written in the form n − φ(n) where φ is Euler's totient function counting the number of values that are smaller than n and relatively prime to it.

There are exactly 222 distinct ways of assigning a meet and join operation to a set of ten unlabelled elements in order to give them the structure of a  lattice, and exactly 222 different six-edge polysticks.

References

Integers